Chomboni is a settlement in Kenya's Eastern Province. It is located in the region of Makueni in Kenya  Makueni's capital Wote (Wote) is approximately 33 km / 20 mi away from Chomboni (as the crow flies). The distance from Chomboni to Kenya's capital Nairobi (Nairobi) is approximately 102 km / 64 mi (as the crow flies).

References 

Populated places in Eastern Province (Kenya)